Thomas Woolfall (born 1871, date of death unknown) was an English professional footballer who played as a right-back.

References

1871 births
English footballers
Association football defenders
Darwen F.C. players
Burnley F.C. players
Bolton Wanderers F.C. players
English Football League players
Year of death missing